Joseph Hoare (21 March 1814 – 21 January 1886) was a British Conservative Party politician and banker.

Early life and family
Born in 1814 at Child's Hill House in Hampstead, London, Hoare was the fourth son of Samuel Hoare and Louisa Gurney, daughter of John Gurney and Catherine Barclay.

Hoare was educated at Trinity College, Cambridge, before becoming a Partner in Hoare's Bank in Lombard Street, London, the UK's oldest and world's fourth oldest bank, which was founded by his ancestor Richard Hoare. He married Anne Amelia Buxton, daughter of Charles Buxton and Martha Henning, in 1836, but they had no children before her death in 1843.

In 1847, he remarried to Rachel Juliana Barclay, daughter of former MP Charles Barclay and Anna Maria Kett.

Political career
He was elected MP for Kingston upon Hull in the 1859 general election but was unseated just under four months later, owing to corruption. In 1868 he stood for election at Manchester
but failed to gain the seat.

Other activities 
Hoare was at some point the Deputy Lieutenant of Middlesex and president of the Hampstead Conservative Association.

References

External links
 

Conservative Party (UK) MPs for English constituencies
Deputy Lieutenants of Middlesex
UK MPs 1859–1865
Alumni of Trinity College, Cambridge
1814 births
1886 deaths
People from Hampstead
Politicians from London
English bankers
Joseph
19th-century English businesspeople